The One West Camp is a subdivision of Hebrew Israelite groups that believe in the Old Testament, the New Testament and the exclusive identification of the Twelve Tribes of Israel with ethnic communities of Black, Latin American, and Native American descent in the Americas.  The movement is named after its first grouping, which was located at One West 125th Street in Harlem in New York City, then known as the 'Israeli School of Universal Practical Knowledge'.  The movement has since splintered into numerous "camps", including the New York-based Israelite Church of God in Jesus Christ, and the Pennsylvania-based Israelite School of Universal Practical Knowledge. Hebrew Israelite Camps related to the One West Camp do not consider themselves Christians and deny the trinity, as well as the belief that Salvation is for all Nations of the Earth; the One West Camp teaches that Jesus was racially black.

The founder of the first grouping and the movement was Eber Ben Yomin, also known as Abba Bivens, who quit the Judaism-related Commandment Keepers of Harlem in 1969, to start a group based on the "12 tribes" doctrine that portrayed a critical view of normative Judaism.

One West Camp groups are known for open-air preaching and protests, and attracted media attention with the January 2019 Lincoln Memorial confrontation which included a small New York-based group.  The great majority of Black Hebrew Israelite groups outside of One West Camp and Nation of Yahweh do not share these beliefs.

References

Black Hebrew Israelites
Nontrinitarian denominations
Religious belief systems founded in the United States